Ezio Bertuzzo (23 July 1952 – 23 February 2014) was an Italian association football coach and player, whose career as a striker spanned from the mid-1960s until 1987. In the 1981–82 season, his Atalanta team won the Serie C1 Group A championship. He began his coaching career in the 1990s until his death in 2014, coaching youth teams in his later years.

Bertuzzo died in February 2014 of an undisclosed incurable disease in Torino. He was 61.

References 

1952 births
2014 deaths
Italian footballers
Italian football managers
Atalanta B.C. players
Bologna F.C. 1909 players
Brescia Calcio players
F.C. Crotone players
Torino F.C. players

Association football forwards
Asti Calcio F.C. players
People from Settimo Torinese
Footballers from Piedmont
Sportspeople from the Metropolitan City of Turin
Association football coaches